Annie Rivieccio (born 1962) is an American bodybuilder and personal trainer. She competed at the Ms. Olympia in 2005–2007 with the best result of third place in 2006. She won the NPC Nationals in 2003 and New York Pro Championship in 2005. She started her bodybuilder career in 1986, aged 24, and later also competed in Olympic weightlifting and powerlifting.

Contest history 
2008 IFBB Atlantic City Pro – 7th
2008 IFBB 15th Annual Sports/Fitness Weekend & Europa IFBB Super Show – 3rd
2008 NPC Tampa Bay Bodybuilding & Figure Contest – 6th
2008 IFBB New York Women's Pro – 6th
2008 IFBB Arnold Classic Bodybuilding, Fitness and Figure Contest – 8th
2007 IFBB Olympia – 10th
2007 IFBB Arnold Classic – 7th
2006 IFBB Olympia – 3rd
2006 IFBB Arnold Classic and Internationals – 7th
2005 IFBB Olympia – 13th
2005 IFBB New York Pro Championship – 1st
2004 IFBB GNC Show Of Strength – 5th
2004 IFBB Night of Champions – 7th
2004 IFBB Arnold Classic and Internationals – 4th
2003 NPC Nationals – 1st, heavyweight and overall

References 

1962 births
American female bodybuilders
Living people
Professional bodybuilders
21st-century American women